Buck Owens Sings Harlan Howard is an album by Buck Owens, released in 1961.

Harlan Howard wrote many of Buck Owens' biggest hits, including "I've Got a Tiger By the Tail," "Above and Beyond," "Excuse Me (I Think I've Got a Heartache)," and "Under the Influence of Love".

The CD re-issued in 1997 by Sundazed Records includes "Foolin' Around", the single that reached Number two on the Billboard Country singles charts.

Reception

In his Allmusic review, critic Stephen Thomas Erlewine wrote "Owens sang Howard better than nearly anybody and Buck Owens Sings Harlan Howard is full of wonderful songs and performances. ... one of Owens' most enjoyable LPs of the '60s."

Track listing

Personnel
Buck Owens – guitar, vocals, harmony vocals
Don Rich – guitar, fiddle
Pee Wee Adams – drums
Bobby Austin – bass
George French – piano
Ralph Mooney – pedal steel guitar
Jim Pierce – piano
Jelly Sanders – fiddle
Wayne Stone – drums
Allen Williams – bass
Production notes
Bob Irwin – producer, mastering
Ken Nelson – producer
Richard Russell – design

References

External links
Reissue review at No Depression magazine.

1961 albums
Buck Owens albums
Capitol Records albums
Albums produced by Ken Nelson (United States record producer)

Albums recorded at Capitol Studios